Kokologo or Kokologho is a village in the Kokologo Department of Boulkiemdé Province in central western Burkina Faso. It is the capital of Kokologo Department and has a population of 9,704.

References

External links
 Satellite map at Maplandia.com

Populated places in Boulkiemdé Province